Terrica Alexander (born July 12, 1994), known professionally as Jucee Froot, is an American rapper from Memphis, Tennessee. She is best known for contributing songs to various film and TV soundtracks such as "Danger" from Birds of Prey (2020), "Eat Itself" from Insecure, and "Down in the Valley" from P-Valley. In 2020, Jucee Froot signed a joint recording contract with Atlantic Records and Art@War, and subsequently rose to prominence with the release of her debut mixtape, Black Sheep (2020).

Discography

Studio albums 
 Black Sheep (2020)

Awards & Nominations

References 

Living people
1994 births
21st-century American rappers
21st-century American women musicians
21st-century women rappers
African-American women rappers
Songwriters from Tennessee
Rappers from Memphis, Tennessee
Southern hip hop musicians
African-American songwriters
21st-century African-American women
21st-century African-American musicians